The Girl Who Drank the Moon is a 2016 children's book by Kelly Barnhill. The book tells how Luna, after being raised by a witch named Xan, must figure out how to handle the magical powers she was accidentally given. She must control her powers before it's too late. The book won the 2017 Newbery Medal. 

Shortly before its release, a prequel short story was released online via Entertainment Weekly.

Plot
Every year the townspeople abandon the youngest baby in the forest, as a "gift" for the bad witch they fear. The witch Xan however, whom the townspeople believe to be the source of all evil, takes the little babies and gives them to another town, where the people raise these children like their own. While doing the same to another baby girl, Xan accidentally feeds the little creature moonlight instead of the starlight she actually feeds them. Now, this baby is magical, and therefore dangerous to normal people. Xan names the baby Luna and decides to raise her with the little dragon Fyrian and the swamp monster Glerk. It is revealed that Xan isn't a witch by birth, rather, one day, she, as an orphan was found by a magician, and raised with them. They made experiments on her, making her magical. One of the magicians, Zosimos, was the one to look after her the most, becoming a father figure and a mentor to her. Xan, who had grieved a long time for her parents, learned to hide her grief from a witch who sucked her grief and thus her energy out of her. Zosimos' 
Xan is the only witch of that time to still be alive, together with Glerk, who is as old as the world itself, and Fyrian, whose mother is dead.

The years pass by, and Xan finds a way to seal Luna's troublesome magic, however, at a great cost: Luna cannot hear the word "magic", fainting from consciousness whenever she hears it, and her sealed magic, when bursting out at Luna's 13th birthday, will drain Xan’s magic, thus also making the witch die.
Meanwhile, a boy named Antain is deeply disturbed by the fact that his town always sacrifices babies to the bad witch, having watched the despair of Luna's mother, who turned crazy due to the loss of her baby daughter. He is a member of the elder council as well, but since he never attempts the ceremony of the sacrificing of the baby again after this trauma, he loses the position. Antain one day decides to visit the Crazy Woman, who now is locked away in a cell and magical as well. At the visit, her magical paper birds attack Antain, leaving him scarred. Antain is deeply scarred again; he starts a job as a carpenter, and soon meets the girl named Ethyne again on whom he always had a deep crush. Ethyne is the only one who doesn't mind his scars, and soon, they marry.

Xan gets weaker and weaker every year, and Luna's 13th birthday nears. Luna can communicate with a crow, and she loves Glerk, Fyrian and her great mother Xan very much. Luna and Xan travel to the city once in a while to look at the people, but never once to the town where the babies are abandoned. Once, when Xan rescues another baby, Antain, who has followed the procession, sees her, but when he tells the elder council about the witch they don't believe him. Ignatia, the leader of the Sisters, whom Ethyne was once a part of, meanwhile always sneaks upon the Crazy Woman, whose grief keeps her alive. Ignatia has magic inside her as well. Antain and Ethyne have a child that is to be sacrificed, but both cannot bear to lose their baby boy, and thus Antain decides to go to the forest and kill the witch. Ignatia, after a conversation with Antain's Uncle, follows him to kill Antain, so that he cannot say anything to the townspeople when they return. The elder council need the sad and grieving people of the town to not ask questions and be silent. The Crazy Woman witnesses the conversation between council member Gherland and Ignatia by transforming into a cockroach. 

Xan, while on the way to get the abandoned baby, transformed into a bird, meets Antain, who accidentally wounds her, thus having to travel with him. Luna, who discovers her grandmother's secret of sealing her magic away through a letter, follows Xan with her crow. Glerk and Fyrian follow them as well. Fyrian, who was always rather too small for a dragon, starts to unexpectedly grow. Luna gets lost in the forest, even though she has a map. The map of the forest is one she painted herself, and carries the sentence "she is here, she is here, she is here", the same sentence the Crazy Woman always mutters. While Antain and Xan, Ignatia, Luna and her crow, and Glerk and Fyrian and the Crazy Woman, who has escaped from her cell the day Antain left, are in the forest to eventually meet, the cloud of grief that has always hung over the town, affecting the mindset of the people, starts to vanish, cleansing the people of their grief, making them ask questions and start seeing dreams of their sacrificed children they thought dead. 
Ethyne, who once was a member of the Sisters and who loathes Ignatia, who loathes her in turn, starts a rebellion with the help of the Sisters who are her friends. The council members disapprove of it, sending Gherland to talk to Ethyne. She however, rebuffs him. 

While Luna soon meets with Ignatia, and barely escapes the dangerous, old woman with the help of the paper birds of the Crazy Woman, which seem to know her, Xan learns the truth as to why the townspeople abandon their youngest babies and feels immense guilt of not being able to see past the cloud of grief and not questioning the abandonment of the babies more.
The Crazy Woman, whose paper birds have carried her to the house of Glerk, Fyrian, Xan and Luna, discovers magical shoes which have the ability to run very wide and fast. 
Ignatia soon meets the Crazy Woman as well, and, as the shoes actually once belonged to Ignatia, she tries to get them back. The Crazy Woman escapes, and soon, Luna meets Antain and Xan. Antain tries to attack her, but Luna can stop him, and it is then when she really discovers her being magical. Xan transforms back to being her real self, and the Crazy Woman as well as Ignatia soon meet them all. It is revealed that Ignatia needs the grief of people to stay alive, thus, when there was a volcano erupt she didn't help the other magicians and witches, eating Xan's grief. She then decided to become the unofficial leader of the town, where she has remained for centuries, spreading rumors of the bad witch in the forest, thus staying alive through people's grief by them losing their youngest children.
Meanwhile, Glerk tells the little Fyrian why he, for a dragon, is small, speculating that the reason being because while his mother died in the volcano erupt centuries ago, he was too close to her. Fyrian learns of Ignatia, whom he, now bigger, spots, and what Ignatia did centuries ago, as Glerk tells him. 
Antain is scarred to find out about Ignatia being the real cause of all this suffering, and the Crazy Woman supports Xan's accusations of Ignatia. It is revealed that the witch Xan hid her grief from was Ignatia. However, Ignatia herself also had a grief about something, and this made her heart harder, thus needing the grief of others to survive. Fyrian, in a rage, tries to kill Ignatia for being responsible for his mother's death, however, is stopped by Luna, Glerk and Xan. Then, after all these centuries, the volcano erupts again, revealing that the witches, magicians and dragons  sealed the volcano just like Xan sealed Luna's magic all these years ago. This time, instead of sealing it, they let it erupt, protecting the towns by making bubbles that protect the town and people from much harm. 
After all if this, Gherland is out in prison, while Ignatia and Xan are in a hospital, due to both of them dying. Luna asks the townspeople of her mother's name, and the Crazy Woman's Name is revealed to be Adara.
It unclear whether Xan is dead at the end, as Glerk, who had always loved Xan, who had always loved him in return, travels with her to the swamp.
Luna and Fyrian grieve for Xan, and Antain and Ethyne, who have Luna and Adara stay with them, support the other townspeople. 
Luna travels with Fyrian to all the other cities and tells them the story of the witch, who rescued the abandoned babies, and the story of the oppressed people, forced to never question the things the elder council and Ignatia did.
The story ends with Luna discovering a poem from Glerk, which he had written for her while leaving for the swamp. The paper the poem was written on becomes a bird and flies into the sky.

Reception
The book was favorably  reviewed. Common Sense Media gave it 5 stars and an A+ for educational value, cited its positive message and role models calling it, "A great choice for middle-grade fantasy lovers." Diana Wagman writing for the New York Times also compliments the book for its ability to impart lessons in an engaging manner, "The young reader who devours it now just for fun will remember its lessons for years to come."

The book won the 2017 Newbery Medal, much to the surprise of Barnhill, who did not think anyone would like it.

References 

2017 children's books
 American children's books
 Children's fiction books
Newbery Medal–winning works